Eguchipsammia cornucopia is a species of coral, described by Louis François de Pourtalès in 1871

References

Dendrophylliidae